Russian Science Citation Index (Russian: Российский индекс научного цитирования (РИНЦ)) is a bibliographic database of scientific publications in Russian. It holds around 13 million publications by Russian authors and information about citing publications from over 5000 Russian journals.  The Russian Science Citation Index has been developed since 2005 by the Scientific Electronic Library eLIBRARY.RU. The information-analytical system Science Index is a search engine of this database; it offers a wide range of services for authors, research institutions and scientific publishers. It is designed not only for operational search for relevant bibliographic information, but is also as a powerful tool to assess the impact and effectiveness of research organizations, scientists, and the level of scientific journals, etc.

Purpose 
From 5000 Russian academic journals, only about 500 are indexed in foreign databases (approx. 10%). Those are mainly translated journals. So far, the vast majority of Russian scientific publications remain "invisible" and are not available online. The Russian Science Citation Index makes it possible to objectively compare Russian journals with the best international journals.

Functionality 
In Russia, this database is one of the main sources of information for evaluating the effectiveness of organizations involved in research. It allows to appraise: 
 Scientific capacity and effectiveness of research, and
 Publication activity
through the following indicators:
 The number of publications (including foreign scientific and technical journals, and local publications from the list of Higher Attestation Commission) of researchers from a particular scientific organization, divided by the number of researchers,
 The number of publications (registered in the Russian Science Citation Index) of researchers from a particular scientific organization, divided by the number of researchers, and
 Citation of researchers (registered in the Russian Science Citation Index) from a particular scientific organization, divided by the number of researchers.

See also 
List of academic databases and search engines
Science Citation Index
Scopus

External links
 Scientific Electronic Library
 

Citation indices
 
Science and technology in Russia